Sorolopha cyclotoma is a species of moth of the family Tortricidae. It is found in New Caledonia, New Guinea and Australia (the Northern territory and Queensland). The habitat consists of rainforests.

Adults have a bold pattern of shades of brown on the forewings, including a prominent white-outlined dark brown circular spot near each apex. The hindwings are plain brown.

References

Moths described in 1901
Olethreutini
Moths of Oceania